Dr. Tivadar Pauler (9 April 1816 – 30 April 1886) was a Hungarian politician, who served as Minister of Religion and Education between 1871 and 1872. He taught for several universities in Zagreb, Győr and Pest. He was the chairman of the first Jurist Assembly in 1870. After 1872 he served as Minister of Justice until 1875. Kálmán Tisza appointed him Minister of Justice again in 1878. Pauler held this position until his death. He was also representative in the Diet of Hungary between 1871 and 1886. He became a member of the Hungarian Academy of Sciences in 1858.

The Civil Act of Parliament and the punisher statute book's works of the preparation was started under his ministerial term. He was the ornate advocate of the Hungarian national interests, for the university's autonomy, its electoral right fighting, and the full restoration of the Hungarian language's teaching is partly big due for him.

References
 Magyar Életrajzi Lexikon

1816 births
1886 deaths
19th-century Hungarian politicians
Education ministers of Hungary
Justice ministers of Hungary
Hungarian people of Austrian descent
Hungarian people of German descent
People from Buda
Politicians from Budapest
Members of the Hungarian Academy of Sciences
Liberal Party (Hungary) politicians
Deák Party politicians